The Waltz King (German: Der Walzerkönig) is a 1930 German historical musical drama film directed by Manfred Noa and starring Hans Stüwe, Claire Rommer and Fred Louis Lerch. It portrays the life of the nineteenth century composer Johann Strauss II. The film's sets were designed by the art director Max Heilbronner. It was distributed by the German branch of First National Pictures.

Cast
 Hans Stüwe as Johann Strauß  
 Claire Rommer as Jetty Treffz  
 Fred Louis Lerch as Josef Strauß
 Ida Wüst as Jettys Mutter  
 Victor Janson as Fürst Pawlowsky  
 Ita Rina as Seine Tochter  
 Henri Baudin as Baron Todesco  
 Jean Golescu as Zigeunerkapelle

References

Bibliography 
 Jörg Schöning. Fantaisies russes: russische Filmmacher in Berlin und Paris, 1920-1930. Edition Text + Kritik, 1995.

External links 
 

1930 films
1930s biographical films
1930 musical films
German biographical films
German musical films
Films of the Weimar Republic
1930s German-language films
Films directed by Manfred Noa
Films set in the 19th century
Films set in Vienna
Films about classical music and musicians
Films about composers
German black-and-white films
Films scored by Eduard Künneke
1930s German films